Northern Mexico, commonly referred as , is an informal term for the northern cultural and geographical area in Mexico. Depending on the source, it contains some or all of the states of Baja California, Baja California Sur, Chihuahua, Coahuila, Durango, Nuevo León, Sinaloa, Sonora and Tamaulipas.

There is no specific border that separates the northern states from the southern states in Mexico. For some authors, only states that have a border with the United States are considered as northern Mexico, i.e. Baja California, Chihuahua, Coahuila, Nuevo León, Sonora and Tamaulipas. Others also include Durango, Sinaloa and Baja California Sur. Other people consider that the north starts above the Tropic of Cancer, but this description would include some parts of Zacatecas and San Luis Potosí that are not considered northern states.

History

Before colonization 

It is not known exactly when the first settlers came to Northern Mexico.  The harsh climate in the region limited the practice of agriculture, so ancient cultures developed a nomadic lifestyle dedicated to hunting and gathering.

One of the most important native cultures at northern Mexico are the Tepehuanes in Durango, who are actually named the Odamis, meaning "people from the mountains". Something similar has happened with the Raramuris in Chihuahua; Raramuri means "people who run", but they are known as Tarahumaras. Other important cultures are Mayos in Sinaloa and Sonora, and Yaquis in Sonora, and Laguneros in Coahuila. In Nuevo León, many nomads were exterminated for resisting the construction of Monterrey.

Colonial era 
The first city of the region was Durango, founded by Francisco de Ibarra, a Basque explorer. During the colonial era, Durango, Chihuahua and some parts of Sinaloa and Coahuila were a Basque colony named the Nueva Vizcaya. Now, most Duranguenses are Basque descendants. Other important cities like Monterrey were founded almost 50 years later.

States

Culture 
Northern Mexican culture is very different from the culture in south and central Mexico. Northern Mexican opinion tends to be more conservative on average on cultural topics like abortion, gay marriage and legalization of marijuana, but more liberal on topics like business or technology. 

In early 2014, the Strategic Communication Cabinet, a statistical consulting services company, published a report called "Social Intolerance In Mexico", in which polls that covered several social issues were conducted in the 45 largest cities and municipalities of the country. Aside from liberal Mexico City, the federal capital, the study found the strongest support for same-sex marriage in northern cities such as Tijuana and La Paz; whereas it was the weakest in Durango, Ciudad Victoria, Chihuahua and Monterrey. As for adoption by same-sex couples, it was more widely accepted in the border cities of Tijuana and Ciudad Juárez, while the least support was found in Chihuahua and Durango. Support for abortion upon request, cannabis legalisation and euthanasia was the weakest in Northern Mexico. Nonetheless, Coahuila became the first state to legalise same-sex marriage in the country.

Festivities 
For a long time, November 20; the anniversary of the Mexican Revolution; was considered the National Day in northern states. This has been changed by some politics implanted by the SEP making obligatory the celebrations of the September 16 (The Independence Day of Mexico) and the Día de los Muertos, which are days that originally weren't celebrated in the region.

Other important days in the north are July 8, the foundation of Durango City (the first city founded in the North) and the carnaval of Mazatlán, celebrated 6 days before Ash Wednesday. Because of the American influence in the region, northern Mexican people also celebrate some American traditions like Halloween, Thanksgiving and Saint Patrick's Day.

Cuisine 
As well as the Spanish and the Indigenous people, Northern Mexico has received Lebanese, Jewish, Portuguese, Chinese, Irish, German, Italian and Spanish immigrants. All this mixture of cultures have strongly influenced the cuisine from the north. Northern Mexican gastronomy is based in beef, goat and pig meat and flour tortillas, which are remnants of Jewish and Lebanese heritage . Because of the German influence cheese and dairy products are also important in the cuisine of the region.

Nachos, Quesadillas and burritos are probably the three most famous dishes from the north. One of the most famous customs from northern Mexico is to reunite family and friends on weekends to prepare barbecue, named Carne Asada by the Mexicans. A variation of this tradition is to prepare discada, a mixture of grilled meats cooked on an agricultural plow disk harrow.

Sports 

Association football, or soccer, is one of the region's most popular sports, as it hosts four out of the eighteen teams that currently play in the Liga MX, the country's top division of the domestic football league system. Major cities are home to these teams such as Monterrey and Tigres UANL, both based in Monterrey, Santos Laguna in Torreón and Tijuana in the border city of the same name. Notably, Northern teams have dominated the Liga MX in the 2010s, winning a combined total of nine titles and reaching more than half of the decade's finals. Moreover, Northern teams that play in the Ascenso MX, the second professional level of the domestic football system, include Juárez, based in the homonymous border city, Dorados de Sinaloa from Culiacán, Cimarrones de Sonora in Hermosillo, Tampico Madero and Correcaminos UAT, both based in the state of Tamaulipas.

Baseball is another popular sport in Northern Mexico, particularly in states such as Sinaloa and Sonora. Seven of the sixteen teams of the Triple-A Mexican League, the country's oldest running professional league, are based in the North: Sultanes de Monterrey, Saraperos de Saltillo, Acereros de Monclova, Algodoneros de Unión Laguna, Generales de Durango, Tecolotes de los Dos Laredos and Toros de Tijuana. Of these, three (Saraperos, Acereros, and Algodoneros) are based in Coahuila, which is thus the only state to have more than one team in the league, and one of only three states or provinces to have three teams in Triple-A baseball (the others being Texas and New York). Sultanes de Monterrey has been the most successful Northern team in the Mexican League, winning ten championships (the third most of any team), but Tecolotes, Saraperos, and Algodoneros all have multiple titles to their names. In winter-league play, the independent Mexican Pacific League (Liga Mexicana del Pacífico or LMP) is based in the North, with most of its eight teams playing in Northwestern Mexico. The league is considered competitive, as the winter schedule coincides with the Major League Baseball offseason and MLB players can participate. Since the 1970s, the winner of the Mexican Pacific League has competed in the prestigious Caribbean Series, won nine times by Mexican teams, primarily in the 21st century, such as Yaquis de Obregón and Naranjeros de Hermosillo, based in the state of Sonora, Venados de Mazatlán and Tomateros de Culiacán, both based in the state of Sinaloa. Moreover, there are several minor state-wide baseball leagues in the region such as Liga Estatal de Béisbol de Chihuahua, Liga Mayor de Béisbol de La Laguna and Liga Norte de México.

Another popular sport is basketball, played at the professional level throughout the entire year between the National Basketball League, founded in 2000, and the Pacific Coast Circuit, which exclusively involves teams based in Northwestern Mexico. The Liga de Básquetbol Estatal de Chihuahua is a minor league played primarily by local teams in the border state of Chihuahua. Remarkably, Chihuahua-born Eduardo Nájera became the second Mexican to play in the National Basketball Association (NBA), after Sinaloa-born Horacio Llamas. As for American football, National Football League (NFL) following is popular in several northern cities, particularly amongst the middle and upper classes. Notably, Torreón-born kicker Raúl Allegre played for several NFL teams throughout his career in the 1980s. Boxing is one of the most popular sports in the country and Northern Mexico has long been a source of world-famous boxers such as Julio César Chávez, his son Julio, Jr., Jorge Arce and Jorge Paez.

Dialect 
Northern Mexican Spanish distinguishes itself from other varieties of Spanish spoken in the country for its strong intonation. Due to its proximity to the United States, it receives a great deal of influence from English. For example, English words such as troca (truck), lonche (lunch) and bai (bye) are of common usage.

In addition to Spanish, there are also many Indigenous languages, with Tepehuan, Mayo, and Tarahumara being among the largest and most prominent. However, another important difference between the North and South-Central Spanish is that Northern Mexico Spanish has not received as much Native American influence as Central and South Mexico Spanish, this is because Northern Mexico has the lowest concentration of Indigenous communities of all regions in the country and there is not a single Indigenous language that surpasses 100,000 speakers.

Curiously, in Spanish dubs from English language films or TV series, it is a cliche to associate the Northern Mexican accent with people from Australia or Southern USA, so a lot of Hispanics wrongly associate Northern Mexican Spanish with Australian English and Southern American English.

Notable people

References 

Geography of Mexico
Regions of Mexico
Cultural regions
Former Spanish colonies